Gerhard Hetz (13 July 1942 – 19 May 2012) was a German Olympic swimmer.  He competed in the 1960 and 1964 Summer Olympics and won a silver medal in the 4 × 200 m freestyle relay and a bronze medal in the 400 m individual medley in 1964.

He set two world records in the 400 m individual medley, in 1962 and 1963. In 1962 he was selected as the German Sportspersonality of the Year. After retirement from competitions he became a successful swimming coach at Blau-Weiß Bochum, SSF Bonn (1968–1975) and then SV Rhenania Köln (1975–1991), training such swimmers as Rainer Henkel, Werner Lampe and Peter Sitt. However, he was also criticized for his harsh training methods. He died in Barra de Navidad, Jalisco, Mexico, where he was running a hotel with his wife. They had three children.

References

1942 births
2012 deaths
German male swimmers
German male freestyle swimmers
Olympic swimmers of the United Team of Germany
Olympic silver medalists for the United Team of Germany
Olympic bronze medalists for the United Team of Germany
Olympic bronze medalists in swimming
Swimmers at the 1960 Summer Olympics
Swimmers at the 1964 Summer Olympics
Medalists at the 1964 Summer Olympics
World record setters in swimming
German emigrants to Mexico
Olympic silver medalists in swimming
People from Hof, Bavaria
Sportspeople from the Upper Palatinate
20th-century German people
21st-century German people